Bosnalijek is a Bosnian pharmaceutical company headquartered in Sarajevo, Bosnia and Herzegovina. Established in 1951, it is the largest pharmaceutical company in Bosnia and Herzegovina, present in more than 20 markets and having annual revenue of around 80 million euros (as of 2018).

History
Bosnalijek was established in 1951 in Sarajevo, FPR Yugoslavia.

In 2005, International Finance Corporation provided Bosnalijek with a €7.5 million loan for the construction of an €18.5 million production and distribution center.

In August 2016, Bosnalijek celebrated its 65-year anniversary. In October 2016, the Government of Federation of Bosnia and Herzegovina sold its remaining shares in the company in the auction.

As of 2019, Bosnalijek is presented in more than 20 markets, with revenues from foreign markets accounting for 76% of all revenues.

References

Pharmaceutical companies established in 1951
Companies based in Sarajevo
Pharmaceutical companies of Bosnia and Herzegovina
1951 establishments in Yugoslavia
Brands of Bosnia and Herzegovina